Craig Hall is an American politician and a Republican member of the Utah House of Representatives representing District 33 since January 1, 2013.

Early life and career
Hall graduated from Taylorsville High School, earned his BA from Utah State University, and his JD from Baylor University's Baylor Law School. When not at the legislature, Hall works as an attorney for Intermountain Healthcare. Hall has been named one of Utah’s “Legal Elite” by the Utah Business Magazine.

Elections
To challenge District 33 incumbent Democratic Representative Neal Hendrickson in 2012, Hall was selected by the Republican convention from four candidates, and won the November 6, 2012 general election with 4,234 votes (52.8%) against Democratic nominee Liz Muniz, who had won the Democratic Primary against Representative Hendrickson.

In 2014, Hall filed for reelection. Liz Muniz ran against him as the Democratic nominee. Hall won the November 4, 2014 general election with 2,788 votes (58.78%) to 1,955 votes (41.22%).  Hall's current term runs until December 31, 2016.

Utah House of Representatives, District 33

Political career
During the 2016 legislative session, Hall served on the Infrastructure and General Government Appropriations Subcommittee, the House Judiciary Committee, and the House Health and Human Services Committee.

2016 sponsored legislation

Hall passed seven of the ten bills he introduced, giving him a 70% passage rate. He also floor sponsored SB0099S02 Transparency for Political Subdivisions.

References

External links
Official page  at the Utah State Legislature
Campaign site

Craig Hall at Ballotpedia
Craig Hall at OpenSecrets

Place of birth missing (living people)
Year of birth missing (living people)
Living people
Baylor Law School alumni
Republican Party members of the Utah House of Representatives
People from West Valley City, Utah
Utah lawyers
Utah State University alumni
21st-century American politicians